Gwendoline Butler, née Williams (19 August 1922 – 5 January 2013) was a British writer of mystery fiction and romance novels since 1956, she also used the pseudonym Jennie Melville. Credited for inventing the "woman's police procedural", is well known for her series of Inspector John Coffin novels as Gwendoline Butler, and by female detective Charmian Daniels as Jennie Melville.

Biography
Born Gwendoline Williams on 19 August 1922 in South London, England, daughter of Alice (Lee) and Alfred Edward Williams., her younger twin brothers are also authors. She was educated at Lady Margaret Hall, Oxford, where she read History, and later lectured there.

On 16 October 1949, she married Dr Lionel Harry Butler (1923–1981), a professor of medieval history at University of St. Andrews and historian, Fellow of All Souls and Principal of Royal Holloway College. The marriage had a daughter, Lucilla  Butler.

In 1956 her John Coffin series of novels began publication under her married name, Gwendoline Butler. In 1962, she decided to use her grandmother's name, Jennie Melville as a pseudonym to sign her Charmian Daniels novels. In addition to her mystery series, she also wrote romantic novels. In 1981, her novel The Red Staircase won the Romantic Novel of the Year Award by the Romantic Novelists' Association.

Gwendoline Butler can claim to be one of the most versatile women crime novelists. Her books have scored in four categories: modern detective stories, Victorian mysteries, Gothic stories and romantic novels. In 1973 the Crime Writers Association (CWA) awarded her the Silver Dagger for ‘A Coffin for Pandora’.  A former member of the Committee of the CWA, a member of the Detection Club, she took her degree in history at Oxford and her training in research ensures complete accuracy in every book. [8]

She died on 5 January 2013.

Bibliography

As Gwendoline Butler

John Coffin Series

The leading detective in the first three stories was an Inspector Winter. He appeared too in the fourth story ‘The Dull Dead’ (1958) but by this time the young John Coffin (described as “mercurial”) had made his first appearance, and it was with Coffin that Gwendoline Butler continued. [9]

There was a quantum leap for John Coffin, in 1989. Starting with the book ‘Coffin in the Black Museum’ his creator took him from south London across the Thames and planted him in east London, in an imaginary district that was obviously based on Docklands. [10]

 Receipt for Murder (1956)
 Dead in a Row (1957)
 The Murdering Kind (1958)
 The Dull Dead (1958)
 The Interloper (1959)
 Death Lives Next Door (1960) a.k.a. Dine and Be Dead
 Make Me a Murderer (1961)
 Coffin in Oxford (1962)
 A Coffin for Baby (1963)
 Coffin Waiting (1964)
 Coffin in Malta (1964)
 A Nameless Coffin (1966)
 Coffin Following (1968)
 Coffin's Dark Number (1969)
 A Coffin from the Past (1970)
 A Coffin for Pandora (1973)
 A Coffin for the Canary (1974)
 Coffin On the Water (1986)
 Coffin in Fashion (1987)
 Coffin Underground (1988)
 Coffin in the Museum of Crime (1989) a.k.a. Coffin in the Black Museum
 Coffin and the Paper Man (1990)
 Coffin on Murder Street (1991)
 Cracking Open a Coffin (1992)
 A Coffin For Charley (1993)
 The Coffin Tree (1994)
 A Dark Coffin (1995)
 A Double Coffin (1996)
 Coffin's Game (1997)
 A Grave Coffin (1998)
 Coffin's Ghost (1999)
 A Cold Coffin (2000)
 A Coffin for Christmas (2000)
 Coffin Knows the Answer (2002)

Major Mearns and Sergeant Denny Series
 The King Cried Murder (1999)
 Dread Murder (2006)

Single novels
 Sarsen Place (1974)
 Olivia (1975)
 The Vesey Inheritance (1975)
 The Brides of Friedberg (1977) a.k.a. Meadowsweet
 The Red Staircase (1979)
 Albion Walk (1982)
 Butterfly (1996)
 Let There Be Love (1997)

As Jennie Melville

Charmian Daniels Series
 Come Home and Be Killed (1962)
 Burning Is a Substitute for Loving (1963)
 Murderers' Houses (1964)
 There Lies Your Love (1965)
 Nell Alone (1966)
 A Different Kind of Summer (1967)
 A New Kind of Killer, an Old Kind of Death (1970) a.k.a. A New Kind of Killer (US title)
 Murder Has a Pretty Face (1981)
 Death in the Garden (1987) a.k.a. Murder in the Garden (US title)
 Windsor Red (1988)
 A Cure for Dying (1989) a.k.a. Making Good Blood (US title)
 Witching Murder (1990)
 Footsteps in the Blood (1990)
 Dead Set (1992)
 Whoever Has the Heart (1993)
 Baby Drop (1994) a.k.a. A Death in the Family (US title)
 The Morbid Kitchen (1995)
 The Woman Who Was Not There (1996)
 Revengeful Death (1998)
 Stone Dead (1998)
 Dead Again (2000)
 Loving Murder (2001)

Single novels
 Hunter in the Shadows (1969)
 The Summer Assassin (1971)
 Ironwood (1972)
 Nun's Castle (1973)
 Raven's Forge (1975)
 Dragon's Eye (1976)
 Axwater (1978) a.k.a. Tarot's Tower (US title)
 Painted Castle (1982)
 Hand of Glass (1983)
 Listen to the Children (1986)
 Complicity (2000)

References

Further reading
 Murder Will Out: The Detective in Fiction, T. J. Binyon (Oxford, 1989)  p. 119
 Patricia Craig and Mary Cadogan, The lady investigates, Oxford (1981)  p. 228
 Foreword  John Kennedy Melling, 1987, A Coffin from the Past, Geoffrey Bles 1970, Chivers Press edition 1987.

External links
 Gwendoline Butler at Fantastic Fiction
 Bibliography at Classic Crime Fiction
 Interview by John Kennedy Melling at Crime Time
 Inspector Winter, Gwendoline Butler’s First Detective (April 2011)
 Tribute to Gwendoline Butler (February 2014)

1922 births
2013 deaths
Alumni of Lady Margaret Hall, Oxford
English crime fiction writers
English romantic fiction writers
RoNA Award winners
Members of the Detection Club
20th-century English novelists
21st-century British novelists
20th-century English women writers
21st-century English women writers
Women romantic fiction writers
English women novelists
Women mystery writers
Pseudonymous women writers
20th-century pseudonymous writers
21st-century pseudonymous writers